Chris Kolankowski (born February 7, 1992) is a professional Canadian football offensive lineman for the Winnipeg Blue Bombers of the Canadian Football League (CFL). He won his first Grey Cup championship in 2017 in his rookie year with the Toronto Argonauts. He played U Sports football for the York Lions from 2012 to 2016. Kolankowski majored in Law and Society while at York University.

Professional career

Toronto Argonauts
Kolankowski was drafted by the Toronto Argonauts in the sixth round, 49th overall, in the 2016 CFL Draft and signed with the club on May 19, 2016. He was released following 2016 training camp and returned to York for his final year of eligibility. He re-signed with the Argonauts on December 7, 2016. He dressed for six regular season games as a back-up offensive lineman as well as both post-season games for the 2017 Toronto Argonauts. He won his first Grey Cup with the Argos in the 105th Grey Cup game. After two seasons, he was released by the Argonauts on April 23, 2019.

Winnipeg Blue Bombers
After sitting out the 2019 season, Kolankowski signed as a free agent with the Winnipeg Blue Bombers on February 6, 2020. However, he also did not play in 2020 due to the cancellation of the 2020 CFL season. He dressed in the last two regular season games as a backup lineman during the 2021 season after spending most of the season on the practice roster. He also dressed in the 108th Grey Cup as the Blue Bombers defeated the Hamilton Tiger-Cats and Kolankowski won his second Grey Cup championship.

References

External links
Winnipeg Blue Bombers bio 

1992 births
Living people
Canadian football offensive linemen
Players of Canadian football from Ontario
Sportspeople from Etobicoke
Canadian football people from Toronto
Toronto Argonauts players
York Lions football players
Winnipeg Blue Bombers players